The Real Academia Nacional de Farmacia (Spanish: Real Academia Nacional de Farmacia) is located in Madrid, Spain.

It was declared Bien de Interés Cultural in 1997.

References 

Buildings and structures in Justicia neighborhood, Madrid
P
Bien de Interés Cultural landmarks in Madrid